Rini is both a given name and surname.

Given name 
People with the given name include:

 Rini Bell (born 1981), American actress
Rini Budiarti (born 1983), Indonesian athletics competitor
Rini Coolen (born 1967), Dutch football player, coach and manager
Rini Dobber (born 1943), Dutch swimmer
 Rini Simon Khanna (born 1964), Indian television news anchor
 Rini Soemarno (born 1958), Indonesian economist and politician
Rini Templeton (1935–1986), American graphic artist, sculptor and political activist
Rini van Woerden (1934–2004), Dutch football player
Rini Wagtmans (born 1946) Dutch road bicycle racer
 Rini Wulandari (born 1984), Indonesian pop singer

Surname 
People with the surname include:

 Adriane Rini, New Zealand philosopher
Marco Martina Rini (born 1990), Italian footballer
 Mary Rini (born 1925), American baseball pitcher
Paige Rini (born 2000), Canadian water skier
 Snyder Rini (born 1948), Solomon Islands politician

Fictional characters 

 Chibiusa (ちびうさ, Chibiusa or Chibi-usa, renamed Rini in some English adaptations) is a fictional character from the Sailor Moon manga series